Cyrestis lutea, the orange straight-line map-wing or little map-wing, is a butterfly of the family Nymphalidae. It is found in Indonesia.

Thin lines run down the wings of and form evenly spaced columns. Together with the horizontal wing veins, the lines form a grid of squares.

Subspecies
Cyrestis lutea lutea (Java)
Cyrestis lutea doliones Fruhstorfer, 1912 (Bali)

References

Cyrestinae
Butterflies of Java
Butterflies described in 1831